Sarah Pickering (born 1972) is a British visual artist working with photography and related media including 3D scanning and digital rendering, performance, appropriated objects and print. Her artist statement says she is interested in "fakes, tests, hierarchy, sci-fi, explosions, photography and gunfire." She is based in London.

Pickering's book Explosions, Fires and Public Order was published by Aperture in 2010. She has had solo exhibitions at Meessen De Clercq, Brussels (2009), Ffotogallery, Wales (2009), Museum of Contemporary Photography, Chicago (MoCP, 2010), and Durham Art Gallery (2013); and was included in Manifesta 11 in Zurich (2016). Her work is held in the collections of the Victoria and Albert Museum, London; MoCP, Chicago, IL; and North Carolina Museum of Art, Raleigh, NC.

She is a part-time teaching fellow in fine art media at the Slade School of Fine Art, University College London.

Life and work
Pickering was born and raised in Durham, England, and attended Belmont Comprehensive School and Durham Sixth Form Centre. After a foundation course in art and design at Newcastle College (1991–1992), she was awarded a BA (Hons.) in photographic studies at the University of Derby (1992–1995), and a MA in photography at the Royal College of Art (2003–2005).

Her artist statement says she is interested in "fakes, tests, hierarchy, sci-fi, explosions, photography and gunfire."

Based in London, she is a part-time teaching fellow in fine art media at the Slade School of Fine Art, University College London.

"Match, 2015", was a 38 metre long public artwork installed at Castlegate Shopping Centre, Stockton-on-Tees between 2016 and 2017.

Publications

Books by Pickering
Sarah Pickering - Explosions, Fires and Public Order. Aperture, 2010. .

Publications with contributions by Pickering
Vitamin Ph, A survey of Contemporary Photography. Phaidon, 2006. .
System Error: War is a Force that Gives us Meaning. Italy: Silvana, 2007. . Edited by L. Fusi and N. Mohaiemen.
How We Are Photographing Britain from the 1840s to the present. London: Tate, 2007. . Edited by Val Williams and Susan Bright.
In our World, New Photography in Britain. 2008. Milan: Skira. . Edited by Filippo Maggia. Pickering's contribution is on pages 142–151.
Foam Album 08. Amsterdam: Foam Fotografiemuseum Amsterdam, 2008. .
New Light: Jerwood Photography Awards 2003–08. Edinburgh: Portfolio Magazine, 2009. . With a foreword by Roanne Dods, an essay by Martin Barnes, and an afterword by Gloria Chalmers.
Theatres of the Real. Antwerp: Fotomuseum Antwerp; Brighton: Photoworks, 2009. .
Realtà Manipolate/Manipulating Reality. Alias, 2009. .
C International Photo Magazine 09. London: Ivorypress, 2009. .
Bruit De Fond/Background Noise. Je Suis une Bande de Jeunes, 2010. .
Afterwards: Contemporary Photography Confronting the Past. London: Thames & Hudson, 2011. . Edited by Nathalie Herschdorfer.
Public Relations. SAFLE Commission, 2012. .
Hijacked III: Australia / United Kingdom. Cottesloe, WA: Big City; Heidelberg: Kehrer, 2012. . Exhibition catalogue.
The Photographer's Playbook: 307 Assignments and Ideas. New York: Aperture, 2014. . Edited by Gregory Halpern and Jason Fulford.
Staging Disorder. London: Black Dog Publishing, 2015. . Edited by Christopher Stewart and Esther Teichmann.
Revelations. London: Mack, 2015. Edited by Ben Burbridge. .

Awards
2005: Worshipful Company of Painter-Stainers Photography Prize, Royal College of Art.
2005: The Photographers' Gallery Graduate Award, London.
2005: Jerwood Photography Award, for Public Order. Other winners were Daniel Gustav Cramer, Nina Mangalanayagam, Oliver Parker, and Luke Stephenson.
2008: Peter S. Reed Award, Peter S. Reed Foundation, USA.
2015: Refocus: the Castlegate mima Photography Prize, Middlesbrough Institute of Modern Art (mima) and Stockton-on-Tees Borough Council. A commission to produce "Match, 2015".

Exhibitions

Solo exhibitions
Fire Scene, Daniel Cooney Fine Art, New York City, 2008.
Explosion, Meessen De Clercq, Brussels, 2009.
Holding Fire, Ffotogallery, Wales, 2009.
Incident Control, Museum of Contemporary Photography, Chicago, IL, 2010.
Aim & Fire, included Celestial Objects and other works, Durham Art Gallery, Durham, England. Part of The Social: Encountering Photography festival, 2013, for which Celestial Objects was commissioned.

Group exhibitions
Part of East International festival, Norwich, UK, 2005. Selected by Gustav Metzger.
How We Are: Photographing Britain from the 1840s to the Present, Tate Britain, London, 2007. Curated by Val Williams and Susan Bright.
'Theatres of the Real' – Contemporary British Post-Documentary Photography, Fotomuseum Antwerp, Antwerp, Belgium, 2009. Curated by David Green and Joanna Lowry.
Manipulating Reality: How Images Redefine the World, Centro di Cultura Contemporanea Strozzina, Fondazione Palazzo Strozzi, Palazzo Strozzi, Florence, Italy, 2009/10.
Signs of a Struggle: Photography in the Wake of Postmodernism, Victoria and Albert Museum, London, 2011. Curated by Marta Weiss.
An Orchestrated Vision: The Theater of Contemporary Photography, Saint Louis Art Museum, St. Louis, MO, 2012.
Living in the Ruins of the Twentieth Century, UTS Gallery, University of Technology, Sydney, Australia, 2013.
Revelations: Experiments in Photography, Media Space, Science Museum, London, 2015; National Media Museum, Bradford, 2015/16. Co-curated by Greg Hobson and Ben Burbridge.
Professions Performing in Art, Manifesta 11, Zurich, 2016. Curated by Christian Jankowski and Francesca Gavin.

Collections
Pickering's work is held in the following permanent collections:
Victoria and Albert Museum, London: 2 prints
Museum of Contemporary Photography, Chicago, IL: 2 prints
North Carolina Museum of Art, Raleigh, NC: 3 prints

References

External links

Video interview from 2010 in which Susan Bright gives an introduction to Pickering, who talks about her Public Order series
Video interviews about making the "Match, 2015" commission for Refocus: the Castlegate mima Photography Prize

Living people
1972 births
People from Durham, England
English women photographers
Alumni of the University of Derby
Alumni of the Royal College of Art
21st-century British women artists
21st-century British photographers
Photographers from London
21st-century women photographers
21st-century English women
21st-century English people